Andrey Yuryevich Kurkov (born 23 April 1961 in Leningrad, USSR) is a Ukrainian author and public intellectual who writes in Russian. He is the author of 19 novels, including the bestselling Death and the Penguin, nine books for children, and about 20 documentary, fiction and TV movie scripts. His work is currently translated into 37 languages, including English, Spanish, Japanese, French, German, Italian, Chinese, Swedish, Persian and Hebrew, and published in 65 countries. Kurkov, who has long been a respected commentator on Ukraine for the international media, notably in Europe and the United States, has written assorted articles for various publications worldwide. His books are full of black humour, post-Soviet reality and elements of surrealism.

Life and works

Kurkov's father was a test pilot and his mother was a doctor.  When he was just 2 his family relocated to Kyiv in connection with his father's work. He started writing at the age of seven when, after the death of two of his three pet hamsters, he wrote a poem about the loneliness of the remaining pet. He also produced poetry about Lenin, purportedly inspired by his Soviet education at the time.

Having graduated in 1983 from the Kyiv Foreign Languages Institute, and as a trained Japanese translator Kurkov was assigned military service assisting the KGB. However, he managed to get his papers changed to service with the military police. This offered him a greater degree of freedom during and after his service period. He was assigned a prison guard position in Odessa. It was during this period that Kurkov wrote all of his children's stories.

His first novel was published two weeks before the fall of the Soviet Union, and in the ensuing social and political turmoil he made the first steps towards self-publishing and distribution. Borrowing money from friends to fund his work, Kurkov managed to publish independently. While organising distribution around Ukraine, he would also sell copies by hand from stalls on busy streets.

Like many successful writers, Kurkov had difficulty getting his first publishing contract. He reportedly received 500 rejections before being accepted, in which time he had written almost eight complete novels.

Later in his career he won acclaim as one of the most successful Ukrainian authors in the post-Soviet era and has featured on European bestseller lists. His novel The Bickford Fuse (published in 2009 in Russian, and in Boris Dralyuk's English-language translation in 2016 by MacLehose Press) was characterised by Sam Leith in The Financial Times as "a sort of cross between The Pilgrim's Progress, Catch-22, Heart of Darkness and Cormac McCarthy's The Road, with a faint shading, here and there, of Samuel Beckett: an insistently dreamlike absurdist satire shaped by the vastness of Russia's landmass and the insanity of its Soviet-era ideology", and reviewed by The Guardian as a "genre-defying work, fusing picaresque adventure with post-apocalyptic parable", while Kurkov himself called it "the dearest and most important of all my works". He has been described by Ian Sansom as "a serious writer never more serious than when he's being funny about unfunny things, and with a whole lifetime of unfunny things to be serious about."

In 2018 he was elected as the President of PEN Ukraine.

Kurkov's most recently translated novel, Grey Bees, which has "elements of both the fable and the epic", dramatises the conflict in his country through the adventures of a beekeeper. The novel was translated into French by Paul Lequesne as Les abeilles grises, which won the 2022 Prix Médicis étranger.

Kurkov lives in Kyiv with his English wife, Elizabeth, and their three children. After the 2022 Russian invasion of Ukraine, he became an internally displaced person and continued to write and broadcast about the war.  A bilingual, native Russian speaker, in a 2022 interview Kurkov speculated that Russia’s war on Ukraine, rather than suppress Ukrainian culture and identity, would potentially have the opposite effect, encouraging Ukrainian writers, especially those whose native language is Russian, to publish increasingly, or even exclusively, in Ukrainian.

Bibliography
Novels translated to English

For children
The Adventures of Baby Vacuum Cleaner Gosha
 Why No One Pets The Hedgehog illustrator: Tania Goryushina, 2012.
Non-fiction:

 Ukraine Diaries: Dispatches from Kiev, 2014

References

External links

ABC National Radio - A recent interview
The Ukrainian Observer: Andrey Kurkov: Ukraine's Literary Success
Freedom Lecture: Andrey Kurkov @ De Balie, Amsterdam

1961 births
21st-century Ukrainian writers
Living people
Writers from Kyiv
Ukrainian male writers
Ukrainian writers
Ukrainian writers in Russian
Prix Médicis étranger winners
Ukrainian novelists